The Gabor transform, named after Dennis Gabor, is a special case of the short-time Fourier transform. It is used to determine the sinusoidal frequency and phase content of local sections of a signal as it changes over time. The function to be transformed is first multiplied by a Gaussian function, which can be regarded as a window function, and the resulting function is then transformed with a Fourier transform to derive the time-frequency analysis. The window function means that the signal near the time being analyzed will have higher weight. The Gabor transform of a signal x(t) is defined by this formula:

The Gaussian function has infinite range and it is impractical for implementation. However, a level of significance can be chosen (for instance 0.00001) for the distribution of the Gaussian function.

Outside these limits of integration the Gaussian function  is small enough to be ignored. Thus the Gabor transform can be satisfactorily approximated as

This simplification makes the Gabor transform practical and realizable.

Inverse Gabor transform 

The Gabor transform is invertible. Because it is over-complete, the original signal can be recovered in a variety of ways. For example, the "unwindowing" approach can be used for any :

Alternatively, all of the time components can be combined together:

Properties of the Gabor transform 

The Gabor transform has many properties like those of the Fourier transform. These properties are listed in the following tables.

Application and example 

The main application of the Gabor transform is used in time–frequency analysis. Take the following function as an example. The input signal has 1 Hz frequency component when t ≤ 0 and has 2 Hz frequency component when t > 0

But if the total bandwidth available is 5 Hz, other frequency bands except x(t) are wasted. Through time–frequency analysis by applying the Gabor transform, the available bandwidth can be known and those frequency bands can be used for other applications and bandwidth is saved. The right side picture shows the input signal x(t) and the output of the Gabor transform. As was our expectation, the frequency distribution can be separated into two parts. One is t ≤ 0 and the other is t > 0. The white part is the frequency band occupied by x(t) and the black part is not used. Note that for each point in time there is both a negative (upper white part) and a positive (lower white part) frequency component.

Discrete Gabor-transformation
A discrete version of Gabor representation

with 

can be derived easily by discretizing the Gabor-basis-function in these equations. Hereby the continuous parameter t is replaced by the discrete time k. Furthermore the now finite summation limit in Gabor representation has to be considered.

Similar to the DFT (discrete Fourier transformation) a frequency domain split into N discrete partitions is obtained. An inverse transformation of these N spectral partitions then leads to N values y(k) for the time window, which consists of N sample values. For overall M time windows with N sample values, each signal y(k) contains K = N  M sample values: (the discrete Gabor representation)

with 

According to the equation above, the N  M coefficients  correspond to the number of sample values K of the signal.

In this case, the number of obtained Gabor-coefficients would be MN′ > K. Hence, more coefficients than sample values are available and therefore a redundant representation would be achieved.

Scaled Gabor transform 
As in short time Fourier transform, the resolution in time and frequency domain can be adjusted by choosing different window function width. In Gabor transform cases, by adding variance , as following equation:

The scaled (normalized) Gaussian window denotes as:

So the Scaled Gabor transform can be written as:

With a large , the window function will be narrow, causing higher resolution in time domain but lower resolution in frequency domain. Similarly, a small  will lead to a wide window, with higher resolution in frequency domain but lower resolution in time domain.

Time-causal analogue of the Gabor transform 

When processing temporal signals, data from the future cannot be accessed, which leads to problems if attempting to use Gabor functions for processing real-time signals. A time-causal analogue of the Gabor filter has been developed in  based on replacing the Gaussian kernel in the Gabor function with a time-causal and time-recursive kernel referred to as the time-causal limit kernel. In this way, time-frequency analysis based on the resulting complex-valued extension of the time-causal limit kernel makes it possible to capture essentially similar transformations of a temporal signal as the Gabor function can, and corresponding to the Heisenberg group, see  for further details.

See also
 Gabor filter
 Gabor wavelet
 Gabor atom
 Time-frequency representation
 S transform
 Short-time Fourier transform
 Wigner distribution function

References

 D. Gabor, Theory of Communication, Part 1, J. Inst. of Elect. Eng. Part III, Radio and Communication, vol 93, p. 429 1946 (http://genesis.eecg.toronto.edu/gabor1946.pdf)
Jian-Jiun Ding, Time frequency analysis and wavelet transform class note, the Department of Electrical Engineering, National Taiwan University, Taipei, Taiwan, 2007.

Integral transforms